Cymothoe caprina is a butterfly in the family Nymphalidae. It is found in the Republic of the Congo and the south-central part of the Democratic Republic of the Congo.

References

Butterflies described in 1897
Cymothoe (butterfly)
Butterflies of Africa
Taxa named by Per Olof Christopher Aurivillius